A Feast for Crows is the fourth of seven planned novels in the epic fantasy  series A Song of Ice and Fire  by American author George R. R. Martin. The novel was first published on October 17, 2005, in the United Kingdom, with a United States edition following on November 8, 2005.

Because of its size, Martin and his publishers split the narrative of the still-unfinished manuscript for A Feast for Crows into two books. Rather than divide the text chronologically in half, Martin instead split the material by plot location, resulting in "two novels taking place simultaneously" with different casts of characters. A Feast for  Crows was published months later, and focuses mainly on southern Westeros.  The concurrent novel A Dance with Dragons, which focuses on other locations such as the North, the Wall and Essos, was advertised for the following year, but was eventually released six years later in 2011. Martin noted that the A  Song of Ice and Fire series would now likely total seven novels.

A Feast for  Crows was the first novel in the series to debut at number one on The New York Times Best Seller list, a feat among fantasy writers only previously achieved by Robert Jordan and Neil Gaiman. In 2006 the novel was nominated for the Hugo Award, the Locus Award, and the British Fantasy Society Award. It has since been adapted, along with A Dance With Dragons, for television as the fifth season of Game of Thrones, though elements of the novel appeared in the series' fourth and sixth seasons.

Plot summary 
The War of the Five Kings is slowly coming to its end. The secessionist kings Robb Stark and Balon Greyjoy have been killed. One claimant to the throne, Stannis Baratheon, has gone to fight off invading wildling tribes at the northern Wall, where Robb's half-brother Jon Snow has become the 998th Lord Commander of the Night's Watch, the order responsible for guarding the Wall. The eight-year-old King Tommen Baratheon now rules in King's Landing under the regency of his mother, Cersei Lannister. The warrior woman Brienne of Tarth has been sent by Cersei's brother (and lover) Jaime Lannister on a mission to find Robb's sister Sansa Stark. Sansa is hiding in the Vale, protected by her mother's childhood friend Petyr “Littlefinger” Baelish, who has murdered his wife (and her aunt) Lysa Arryn, and named himself Protector of the Vale and guardian of Lysa's son, the eight-year-old Lord Robert Arryn.

Prologue 
Pate is a young apprentice at the Citadel in Oldtown, training to become a member of the ancient order of scholar-healers known as maesters.  At the request of a stranger, he has stolen an important key to a depository of books and records.  After turning over the stolen key and receiving the reward of a gold coin, he bites the coin and dies abruptly from poisoning.

King's Landing 
Following the death of Tywin Lannister, the late Hand of the King, Queen Cersei's regency is marked by rampant cronyism, and her councils are staffed with incompetent officials and unreliable sycophants.  She disregards advice from her uncle Kevan and her brother Jaime, alienating them both.  Making matters worse is Cersei's increasing distrust of the powerful Tyrells, whose alliance is essential to the stability of the Lannister regime — particularly King Tommen's fiancée Margaery, whom Cersei believes to be the subject of a prophecy about a "younger, more beautiful queen" who will take away all that Cersei holds dear.

Her reckless management raises the kingdom's debts to the Iron Bank of Braavos and the Faith of the Seven.  When Cersei defaults the debt owed to the Iron Bank, the Bank's financial retaliation nearly cripples the economy of Westeros.  To settle the crown's debts to the Faith, Cersei permits the restoration of that religion's military order, the Faith Militant, ignoring the danger of a re-armed Faith.  A scheme to falsely have the Faith put Margaery on trial for adultery backfires when the religious leadership imprisons Cersei herself on similar (correct) charges.

Riverlands 
Cersei dispatches Jaime to the Riverlands to put down the remnants of the late Robb Stark's rebellion.  He unsuccessfully negotiates with Robb's great-uncle Brynden “the Blackfish” Tully to surrender the castle of Riverrun in exchange for his nephew Edmure‘s life, but then convinces Edmure to surrender to save the lives of his men and his unborn child.  Though the siege ends bloodlessly, Brynden escapes.  Jaime then receives word that Cersei, who has been arrested by the Faith, wants him to defend her in a trial by combat, but Jaime burns her letter and abandons her to her fate.

Brienne's quest leads her all over the Riverlands, where she witnesses the devastation caused by the war.  She acquires Podrick Payne, the former squire of Jaime's brother Tyrion, and Ser Hyle Hunt, a knight who had once mocked her ugliness, as traveling companions.  She learns that Sansa's sister Arya Stark has actually survived and escaped King's Landing, and the feared warrior Sandor Clegane is reportedly dead but someone wearing his helmet has massacred the town of Saltpans. She later kills the culprit Rorge but is gravely injured and mutilated by his companion Biter.  Eventually, she is captured by the Brotherhood Without Banners, which was once devoted to protecting the smallfolk of the Riverlands but is now commanded by the magically resurrected Catelyn Stark, Sansa's mother.  The undead and vengeful Catelyn, who has taken the name Lady Stoneheart, sentences Brienne to death for consorting with the Lannisters, but offers to spare her and her companions if she agrees to kill Jaime.

The Vale 
In the remote castle of the Eyrie, Sansa poses as Littlefinger’s illegitimate daughter Alayne Stone, befriending the young Lord Robert Arryn, managing the household, and receiving informal training in politics.  During this time, Littlefinger appears to be carefully manipulating Robert's bannermen to secure his status as Lord Protector of the Vale.  He eventually reveals that he plans to betroth Sansa to Harrold Hardyng, the next heir in line to the Vale; when the sickly Robert dies, Littlefinger intends to reveal Sansa's identity and claim her family stronghold of Winterfell in her name.

Iron Islands 
On the Iron Islands, the late Balon Greyjoy's eldest surviving brother Euron returns from exile to claim the throne. To prevent this, his younger brother Aeron, a priest, calls a Kingsmoot to elect the successor.  Although Euron's claim is contested by his other younger brother Victarion and Balon's daughter Asha, eventually Euron is chosen as king for his promise to conquer Westeros and control Daenerys Targaryen's dragons with an enchanted horn he possesses.  Under Euron's leadership, the Iron Fleet attacks the Reach, threatening House Tyrell's seat at Highgarden.  Euron sends Victarion east to propose marriage to Daenerys on his behalf, to thus gain a claim to the Iron Throne; but Victarion secretly decides to woo her for himself instead.

Dorne 
In the southern region of Dorne, Prince Doran Martell is confronted by three of the Sand Snakes — his brother Oberyn's bastard daughters, who want vengeance for the death of their father.  Because they are inciting the commonfolk, Doran has his guard captain Areo Hotah arrest and imprison them in the palace.

A bold attempt by Doran's daughter Arianne to create a war of succession by crowning Tommen's sister Myrcella as queen of Westeros is thwarted.  In the confusion, one of Arianne's co-conspirators, Ser Gerold "Darkstar" Dayne, attempts to kill Myrcella and disfigures her face.  Myrcella's guardian, Ser Arys Oakheart, is killed by Areo Hotah.  This strains Dorne's new alliance with the Iron Throne.  Doran later reveals to his daughter that he has a much grander plan to bring down the Lannisters, and her brother Quentyn has gone east to bring back "Fire and Blood" through an alliance with Daenerys.

Braavos 
Arriving in the foreign city of Braavos, Arya Stark finds her way to the cult of face-changing assassins known as the Faceless Men.  Accepted as a novice, Arya is taught to abandon her previous identity, but her true identity asserts itself in the form of wolf dreams.

Meanwhile, the Night's Watch lord commander Jon Snow has ordered Samwell Tarly to sail to the Citadel in Oldtown to train as a maester and warn the Seven Kingdoms about the return of the legendary hostile beings known as the Others.  Sam is accompanied by the elderly Maester Aemon, the wildling girl Gilly, Gilly's newborn baby, and another Night's Watch member, Dareon.  After the voyage is underway, Sam realizes that the child is actually the son of the wildling leader Mance Rayder, swapped with Gilly's real son.  The party becomes temporarily stranded in Braavos when Aemon becomes sick, and Dareon absconds with their money. After learning that Daenerys possesses dragons, Aemon concludes that she is destined to fulfill a prophecy, and he needs to go assist her; but shortly after the party finally leaves Braavos, Aemon dies at the age of 102.

After Sam's party leaves, Arya chances upon Dareon and murders him for deserting the Night's Watch.  As punishment for the unauthorized killing, the Faceless Men then feed her a potion that causes blindness.

Oldtown 
At the end of the novel, Sam arrives at the Citadel and is introduced to Archmaester Marwyn.  After learning about Aemon's death and the dragon prophecy about Daenerys, Marwyn leaves to find Daenerys himself.  Samwell also encounters a fellow apprentice who introduces himself as Pate.

Characters 
The story is narrated  from the point of view  of 12 characters and a one-off prologue point of view. Unlike its predecessors, the fourth novel follows numerous minor characters as well.
 Prologue: Pate, a novice of the Citadel in Oldtown
 Cersei Lannister, The Queen Regent
 Ser Jaime Lannister, Lord Commander of the Kingsguard
 Brienne, Maid of Tarth, a young warrior woman searching for Sansa and Arya Stark
 Sansa Stark, pretending to be Petyr Baelish's  daughter "Alayne Stone" (her later chapters are titled as such)
 Arya Stark, later referred to as "Cat of the Canals", beginning her training at The House of Black and White in the free city of Braavos
 Samwell Tarly, a sworn brother of the Night's Watch
 In the Iron Islands:
 The Prophet, The Drowned Man: Aeron "Damphair" Greyjoy, Self-proclaimed servant of the Drowned god, youngest of Late King Balon's three surviving brothers
 The Kraken's Daughter: Princess Asha Greyjoy, daughter of  Late King Balon of the Iron Islands
 The Iron Captain, The Reaver: Prince Victarion Greyjoy, Captain of the Iron Fleet, one of Late King Balon's three surviving brothers
 In Dorne:
 The Captain of Guards: Areo Hotah, Captain of the Guards to Prince Doran Martell of Dorne
 The Soiled Knight: Ser Arys Oakheart of the Kingsguard
 The Queenmaker, The Princess in the Tower: Arianne Martell, daughter of Prince Doran and heir to Dorne

Editions 
Foreign-language editions
 Bulgarian: Бард: "Пир за Врани"
 Catalan: Alfaguara: "Festí de corbs" ("Feast of crows")
 Chinese (Simplified): 重庆出版社(2008): "群鸦的盛宴" ("Feast for Crows").
 Chinese (Traditional): 高寶國際(2006): "群鴉盛宴" ("Feast for Crows").
 Croatian: "Gozba vrana" ("Crows' Feast")
 Czech: Talpress; "Hostina pro vrány" ("Feast for Crows")
 Danish: Kragernes rige ("The Kingdom of the Crows")
 Dutch: Luitingh-Sijthoff: "Een feestmaal voor kraaien" ("A Feast for Crows")
 Estonian: Two volumes, hardcover : Varrak "Vareste pidusöök" ("Feast of Crows") book 1 & book 2
 Finnish: "Korppien kestit" ("Feast of Crows")
 French: Three Volumes, Hardcover: Pygmalion (2006–...): "Le chaos", "Les sables de Dorne", "Un Festin pour les Corbeaux" ("Chaos", "The Sands of Dorne", "A Feast For Crows").
 German: Single volume, Fantasy Productions (2006): "Krähenfest" ("Crow's Feast", to be released). Two volumes, Blanvalet (2006): "Zeit der Krähen", "Die dunkle Königin" ("Time of the Crows", "The Dark Queen").
 Greek: Anubis: "Βορά Ορνίων" ("Prey of Vultures")
 Hebrew: "משתה לעורבים א\ב" ("Feast for Crows pts. A/B")
 Hungarian: Alexandra Könyvkiadó: "Varjak lakomája" ("Feast of Crows")
 Italian: Two volumes, Arnoldo Mondadori Editore (Hardcover 2006, 2007 – Paperback 2007, 2008): "Il dominio della regina", "L'ombra della profezia" ("The Rule of the Queen", "The Shadow of the Prophecy").
 Japanese: Two volumes, hardcover : Hayakawa (2008), paperback : Hayakawa (2013): "乱鴉の饗宴" ("Feast of the War Crows") I and II
 Korean: Eun Haeng Namu Publishing Co. :"까마귀의 향연" ("Feast for Crows")
 Lithuanian: Alma Littera "Varnų puota" ("Crows' Feast")
 Norwegian: Two volumes, "Kråkenes gilde" (The Crows' Feast), "Jern og sand" (Iron and Sand)
 Polish: Two volumes, Zysk i S-ka: "Uczta dla wron: Cienie Śmierci", "Uczta dla wron: Sieć Spisków" ("A Feast for Crows: Shadows of Death", "A Feast for Crows: Web of Intrigues")
 Brazilian Portuguese: Leya: "O Festim dos Corvos" ("The Crows Feast")
 European Portuguese: Two volumes, Saída de Emergência: "O Festim de Corvos" ("A Feast of Crows"), "O Mar de Ferro" ("The Iron Sea")
 Romanian: Paperback 2009, Hardcover 2011: "Festinul ciorilor" ("The Crows' Feast")
 Russian: AST: "Пир стервятников" ("Vultures' Feast").
 Serbian: Two Volumes, Лагуна: "Гозба за вране Део први", "Гозба за вране Део други" ("A Feast for Crows")
 Slovakia: Tatran: "Hostina pre vrany" ("Feast for Crows")
 Slovenian: Vranja gostija ("A Feast for Crows")
 Spanish: Gigamesh (2007): "Festín de Cuervos" ("Feast of Crows")
 Swedish: Forum bokförlag: "Kråkornas fest" ("The Crows' Feast")
 Turkish: Two volumes, Epsilon Yayınevi: "Buz ve Ateşin Şarkısı IV: Kargaların Ziyafeti – Kısım I & Kargaların Ziyafeti – Kısım II" ("A Feast for Crows")
 Ukrainian: KM Publishing (2016): "Бенкет круків" ("The Feast of Crows")
 Vietnamese: Two Volumes: "Trò Chơi Vương Quyền 4A: Tiệc Quạ đen", "Trò Chơi Vương Quyền 4B: Lời Tiền tri". ("Game of Thrones 4A: A Feast of Crows", "Game of Thrones 4B: The Prophecy")
 Mongolian: Хэрээний найр ("Feast of Crow")

Publication 
Martin released the first four "Iron Islands" chapters of A Feast for Crows as a novella called Arms of the  Kraken, published in the 305th edition of Dragon magazine, published in May 2003. Another chapbook featuring three Daenerys chapters was published for BookExpo 2005 although, following the geographical division of the book, these chapters were subsequently moved into the fifth volume in the series, A Dance with Dragons.

Martin originally planned for the fourth book to be called A Dance with Dragons with the story picking up five years after the events of A Storm of Swords (primarily to advance the ages of the younger characters). However, during the writing process, it was discovered that this was leading to an overreliance on flashbacks to fill in the gap. After twelve months or so of working on the book, Martin decided to abandon much of what had previously been written and start again, this time picking up immediately after the end of A Storm of Swords. He announced this decision, along with the new title A Feast for Crows, at Worldcon in Philadelphia on September 1, 2001. He also announced that A Dance with Dragons would now be the fifth book in the sequence.

In May 2005, Martin announced that his manuscript for A Feast for  Crows had hit 1527 completed pages but still remained unfinished, with "another hundred or so pages of roughs and incomplete chapters, as well  as other chapters, sketched out but entirely unwritten." As the size of the manuscript for the 2000s A Storm of Swords, his previous novel, had been a problem for publishers around the world at 1521 pages, Martin and his publishers had decided to split the narrative planned for A Feast for  Crows into two books. Rather than divide the text in half chronologically, Martin opted to instead split the material by character and location:
It was my feeling ... that we were better off telling all the story for half the characters, rather than half the story for all the characters. Cutting the novel in half would have produced two half-novels; our approach will produce two novels taking place simultaneously, but set hundreds or even thousands of miles apart, and involving different casts of characters (with some overlap).

Martin noted that A Feast for  Crows would focus on "Westeros, King's  Landing, the riverlands, Dorne, and the Iron Islands," and that the next novel, A Dance with Dragons, would cover "events in the east and north." Martin also added that the A  Song of Ice and Fire series would now likely total seven  novels. A Feast for  Crows was published months later on October 17, 2005, over five years after the previous volume in the series, A Storm of Swords. The parallel novel A Dance with Dragons was released on July 12, 2011.

Release details 
 2005, UK, Voyager , Pub date October 17, 2005, hardback
 2005, UK, Voyager , Pub date ? ? 2005, hardback (presentation edition)
 2005, US, Spectra Books , Pub date November 8, 2005, hardback
 2006, UK, Voyager , Pub date April 25, 2006, paperback

Reception 
Though A Feast for  Crows was the first novel in the sequence to debut at number one on The New York Times Best Seller list, it received more negative reviews in comparison with the previous novels in the series.  Martin's decision to halve the plot in terms of character and location was highly controversial; many critics felt that this novel consisted of characters that people were less interested in.  Publishers Weekly said, "Long-awaited doesn't begin to describe this fourth installment in bestseller Martin's staggeringly epic Song of Ice and Fire. [...]. This is not Act I Scene 4 but Act II Scene 1, laying groundwork more than advancing the plot, and it sorely misses its other half. The slim pickings here are tasty, but in no way satisfying." Salon.com's Andrew Leonard said in 2011, "I don't care how good a writer you are: If you subtract your three strongest characters from your tale, you severely undermine the basis for why readers fell under your spell in the first place. It didn't work. But there was also a sense in A Feast of Crows that Martin had lost his way. The characters whose stories he did tell wandered back and forth across a landscape devastated by war and oncoming winter, but didn't seem to be headed anywhere in particular." Remy Verhoeve of The Huffington Post noted in their 2011 A Dance with Dragons review that the fifth volume had to "repair some of the damage done by A Feast for Crows, which frankly felt as if it was written by a ghost writer at times." Both books had "the same structural problems", being "sprawling and incoherent", and in her opinion Feast has the less interesting characters. The Atlantic Rachael Brown said in their A Dance With Dragons review that Feast was "bleak and plodding" and "sorely missed" Daenerys Targaryen, Tyrion Lannister, and Jon Snow.

Awards and nominations 
 Hugo Award – Best Novel (nominated) – (2006)
 Locus Award for Fantasy  – Best Novel (nominated) – (2006)
 British Fantasy Award – Best Novel (nominated) – (2006)
 Quill Award – Best Novel (Science Fiction & Fantasy) (nominated) – (2006)

References

External links 
  of author George R. R. Martin
 
 

2005 American novels
2005 fantasy novels
A Song of Ice and Fire books
American fantasy novels
Novels by George R. R. Martin
Voyager Books books